At the 1924 Summer Olympics held in Paris, 27 athletics events were contested, all for men only. The competitions were held from 6 to 13 July.

Medal summary

Medal table

Participating nations
657 athletes from 40 nations competed.  Ten nations competed in athletics for the first time. Cuba, Lithuania, Romania, Uruguay and Germany were the only five nations not to compete in athletics.

References

 
1924
1924 Summer Olympics events
International athletics competitions hosted by France
Athletics in Paris
Sports competitions in Paris
Olympics